The Ballarat Base Hospital is a hospital located in Ballarat, Victoria, Australia. It is a public hospital operated by Ballarat Health Services. Ballarat Health Services employs approximately 4000 staff at the Base Hospital, the Queen Elizabeth Centre 1 km to the south-west, and 13 off-site facilities in the surrounding area.

History
During the gold rush of the 1850s, the Government Camp provided medical support but mainly for  officers and not for miners and the general community. Those wounded at the Eureka Stockade in 1854 received varying attention and the need for a hospital became apparent.  A year later building of a hospital commenced.

The five storey Henry Bolte wing, designed by architects Bates Smart was completed in 1994.

In 1997, the Ballarat Base Hospital merged with the Queen Elizabeth Centre and the Grampians Psychiatric Service to form Ballarat Health Services.

Specialties
Cardiology
Emergency medicine
Gastroenterology
Infectious disease medicine
Lower gastrointestinal surgery
Nephrology
Otorhinolaryngology
Upper gastrointestinal surgery
Vascular surgery
Oncology
Pediatrics
Plastic and Reconstructive Surgery

See also
List of hospitals in Australia

Notes

Further reading 
Hyslop, Anthea, Sovereign Remedies: A History of Ballarat Base Hospital, 1850s-1980s, Allen & Unwin, Sydney, 1989
Menadue, H. W., First Fifty Years: Ballarat Base Hospital Trained Nurses' League, 1929-1978, Ballarat Base Hospital Trained Nurses' League, Ballarat, 1978
Menadue, H. W. (ed.), Register of the Nurse Training School 1888-1988, Ballarat Base Hospital, Ballarat Base Hospital Trained Nurses' League, Ballarat, 1993

External links 

Ballarat Health Services website

Buildings and structures in Ballarat
Hospital buildings completed in 1994
Hospitals in Victoria (Australia)
Hospitals established in 1855